Shivranjani Rajye is a princess  of the royal family of Jodhpur State, the daughter of Former Maharajah Gaj Singh and Hemlata Rajye. She has one younger brother, Shivraj Singh of Jodhpur. She is a businesswoman and owns the Jodhpur Girls Polo team. She is a curator and manager of the Umaid Bhavan Palace, Mehrangarh Fort.

References

Businesswomen from Rajasthan
Living people
Year of birth missing (living people)
Rajput princesses 
Indian princesses 
People from Jodhpur